The 1999 South Florida Bulls football team represented the University of South Florida (USF) in the 1999 NCAA Division I-AA football season, and was the third team fielded by the school. The Bulls were led by head coach Jim Leavitt in his third year, played their home games at Raymond James Stadium in Tampa, Florida and competed as a Division I-AA Independent. The Bulls finished the season with a record of seven wins and four losses (7–4). William Pukylo corner back led team in interceptions with 8, named Bulls defensive player of the year.

Schedule

Roster

References

South Florida
South Florida Bulls football seasons
South Florida Bulls football